Eden Mountain is a mountain on Vancouver Island, British Columbia, Canada, located  east of Woss and  southwest of Mount Romeo.

See also
List of mountains of Canada

References

Vancouver Island Ranges
One-thousanders of British Columbia
Rupert Land District